In the Land of the Deaf (French title Le Pays Des Sourds) is a French documentary created and produced by Nicolas Philibert in 1992.<ref name="frdiplomatie">France Diplomatie: [http://www.diplomatie.gouv.fr/en/france-priorities_1/documentary_2312/non-commercial-distribution_2313/documentaries_5315/5-films-by-nicolas-philibert_3149/in-the-land-of-the-deaf_3164/index.html In the Land of the Deaf] .</ref>  The film is presented French Sign Language (FSL) and French, with English subtitles and closed captions.  Philibert uses sparse dialogue in creating an unsentimental, non-manipulative work which allows its subjects to communicate their feelings about the richness of life despite hearing problems.

Prior to its initial theatrical release, this excursion into the unique world of Deaf communities in France was featured in international film festivals.

In its subsequent broadcast debut in the United States, the film was honored with a Peabody Award for excellence.

Synopsis
This film focuses on the interrelationships between Deaf culture and language in France. Its overview encompasses a broad range of perspectives, contrasting the stories of a family who has been deaf and thriving for five generations with the story of a woman whose deafness was misunderstood, causing her to be confined for a time in an asylum for the insane.  The documentary features d/Deaf and hard of hearing people of all ages and from all walks of life. With their profound deafness in common, the children and adults featured in this film communicate their dreams and thoughts through sign language. In one segment, Philibert focuses his camera on group of schoolchildren who are learning how to communicate in a world where they must read lips and speak words.  The personal lives of some of the pupils and various adults are explored, including an actor, a sign-language teacher, and an engaged couple.

Co-production
This documentary was co-produced by multinational partners, which reduced the financial risks inherent in the project; and co-production also ensured enhanced distribution opportunities.

  Les Films d’Ici.
  La Sept-cinéma.
  Rhône-Alpes European Cinematographic Centre.
  Canal +.
  Rhône-Alpes région.
  Centre National de la Cinématographie.
  Fondation de France.
  Ministry of Foreign Affairs (France).
  Rai Tre.
  BBC Television.
  Télévision Suisse Romande.

Film festivals and honors
This small film has attracted an appreciative international audience. The quotidian life of the deaf as presented by Philibert is distinguished by an unsentimental compassion and an affirmation of the serendipitous.
 Locarno International Film Festival (Switzerland), official selection, 1992.
 Yamagata International Documentary Film Festival (Japan), official selection, 1993.
 Cannes Film Festival (France), Prix de la Fondation GAN pour le Cinéma, 1992.
  Belfort Film Festival (France), Grand Prize, 1992.
  Festival dei Popoli (Italy), Grand Prize, 1992.
 Vancouver International Film Festival (Canada), Grand Prize, 1993.
 Valladolid International Film Festival (Spain), Special Jury Prize (Prix «Tiempo de Historia»), 1993.
 Mumbai International Film Festival (India), Grand Prize, 1994.
 San Francisco International Film Festival (USA), Golden Gate Award, 1994.
 Potsdam International Film Festival (Germany), Best Documentary, 1994.
  Communication Awards (USA), Stephanie Beacham Award, 1994.
 Peabody Award (USA), 1997.

See also
 List of Peabody Award winners (1990-1999)
 List of films featuring the deaf and hard of hearing

Notes

References
 Boiron, Michel.   Le pays des sourds. TV5MONDE l'émission de mois: Fiche No. 57, April 2004.
 Delaporte, Yves. (2002).  Les sourds, c'est comme ça: ethnologie de la surdimutité. Paris: Maison des sciences de l'homme. ;  OCLC  49382889
 Harrington, Richard.   Review: "In the Land of the Deaf," Washington Post. October 7, 1994.
 James, Caryn.  Review: "Discovering Eloquence Amid Silent Gestures," New York Times. September 14, 1994.
 Philibert, Nicolas. (1992).  Le pays des sourds. Paris: Ministere des Affaires Etrangères.
 Ramnarayan, Gowri.  The Hindu'' (Chennai). April 26, 2004.

External links
  DailyMotion.en:  Le pays des sourds—video clip, 01:23 mins.
  Le pays des sourds at Internet Movie Database  
  In the Land of the Deaf at Rotten Tomatoes 
 Nicolas Philibert website

1992 films
French Sign Language films
1990s French-language films
Peabody Award-winning broadcasts
Documentary films about deaf people
1992 documentary films
Films directed by Nicolas Philibert
French documentary films
1990s French films
Films about disability